The Swedish Press Council (Swedish: Pressens Opinionsnämnd, PON) is a body governed by the Swedish print media tasked with determining whether the actions of a newspaper is in line with good journalistic practice. Complaints regarding the practices of print media can be reported by the general public to the Press Ombudsman who determines whether a complaint should be brought before the Press Council. The PON can issue fines of up to SEK 2,000 and publish a rejecting opinion.

The charter of the PON, the standing instructions of the Press Ombudsman, and funding for both is the responsibility of the Press's Cooperation Committee.

References

External links 
Official website 

Journalism-related professional associations
Consumer organizations in Sweden
Mass media complaints authorities
Regulation in Sweden